L'Institut Pere Mata is a  psychiatric hospital in  Reus, Catalonia, Spain. The building was designed by the Catalan Modernist architect Lluís Domènech i Montaner. The hospital predates Hospital Sant Pau of Barcelona and it has a similar structure. Lluís Domènech i Montaner followed the structure of different buildings for different specialities.

The building process took place from 1897 to 1912.

Currently the building is still used as a psychiatric hospital, but one of the pavilions is not in medical use anymore and can be visited.

External links 
Tourism of Reus - Visit Institut Pere Mata

Hospital buildings completed in 1912
Modernisme architecture in Reus
Buildings and structures in Reus
Pere Mata
Pere Mata
Lluís Domènech i Montaner buildings
Art Nouveau hospital buildings
1912 establishments in Spain